Trey Culver (born July 18, 1996) is an American track and field athlete who competes in the high jump. He is a two-time NCAA champion and has competed for team USA at the NACAC Championships.

Early life 
Trey was born in Dallas, Texas to Regina and Hiawatha Culver Jr. He grew up in Lubbock, Texas where he attended Coronado High School. He finished third in the state 5A high jump in his senior year. Leaving high school he had JUCO offers to play basketball but decided to attend his hometown school, Texas Tech University, to compete on the Track and Field Team.

Career 
College Career

Culver has a very successful college career at Texas Tech. He was a seven-time USTFCCCA All-American, the 2017 USTFCCCA Male Scholar Athlete of the Year, the 2018 CoSIDA Male Academic All-American of the Year, a three-time Big-12 Champion, and a two-time NCAA indoor champion. On January 13, 2018 he jumped his indoor personal best 2.33m at the Corky Classic which at the time was the 4th highest jump in NCAA history.

Non-Collegiate Career

Culver first represented the United States at the 2016 NACAC U23 meet where he cleared 2.19m for second place. He also represented the United States at the 2018 NACAC Championships where he finished in 8th place clearing 2.16m. In 2021 he finished 5th at the U.S. Olympic Trails. He has an outdoor personal best of 2.28m from 2018.

Personal life 
Trey is from an athletic family. He has two younger brothers, J.J., and Jarrett. J.J. played basketball collegially for Wayland Baptist where he once scored 100 points in a single game. His youngest brother, Jarrett played basketball at Texas Tech and now is a professional basketball player in the NBA.

His father is a pastor at Rising Star Baptist Church in Lubbock.

References 

Living people
1996 births
American male high jumpers
Texas Tech Red Raiders men's track and field athletes
21st-century African-American sportspeople
Track and field athletes from Texas
Sportspeople from Lubbock, Texas
Sportspeople from Dallas